Jean Schmit (27 April 1915 – 29 October 1991) was a Luxembourgian footballer. He played in two matches for the Luxembourg national football team in 1936. He was also part of Luxembourg's squad for the football tournament at the 1936 Summer Olympics, but he did not play in any matches.

References

External links
 

1915 births
1991 deaths
Luxembourgian footballers
Luxembourg international footballers
Place of birth missing
Association football defenders
Stade Dudelange players